The Queensland – New South Wales Interconnector (QNI) is a 330 kV AC interconnection between New South Wales and Queensland, Australia. 
The link was commissioned in 2001. It consisted of double-circuit 330 kV lines between Armidale, Dumaresq, Bulli Creek and Braemar and a double-circuit 275 kV line between Braemar and Tarong.  
There is an additional 330kV Dual Circuit to complement the QNI from Bulli Ck Switching Station (27°55'15.8"S 150°50'34.8"E) via Millmerran Power Station & Switching Stations (27°57'53.7"S 151°16'26.9"E) to Middle Ridge Switching Station & 330/275/110kV Sub, South of Toowoomba (27°37'22.2"S 151°56'43.0"E). 
The original maximum transfer capacity was 300 to 350 MW in both directions. This has been progressively increased to 700 MW from New South Wales to Queensland and 1,200 MW from Queensland to New South Wales. 
The interconnector is operated by TransGrid and Powerlink Queensland.

References

2001 establishments in Australia
Electric power transmission systems in Australia
Energy in New South Wales
Energy in Queensland